Charles Chisholm Drake (November 2, 1887 – July 16, 1984) was an American brigadier general and quartermaster of the United States Army Forces in the Far East during the Battle of Bataan.

Junior officer

Drake graduated from the United States Military Academy in June 1912 and was promoted to second lieutenant in the  7th Infantry Division. He participated in the United States occupation of Veracruz May 29 to October 20, 1914. He was promoted to first lieutenant on July 1, 1916.

World War I
Drake was promoted to captain and transferred to the 58th Infantry Regiment on May 15, 1917 at Gettysburg, Pennsylvania. The unit was sent to France in May 1918 and Drake received a temporary promotion to major in June and subsequently participated in the Aisne-Marne Offensive, the St. Mihiel Offensive, and the Meuse-Argonne Offensive.

Between wars
Drake was permanently promoted to major and transferred to the Army Quartermaster Corps effective July 1, 1920. He graduated from the School of the Line in 1922, the General Staff School in 1923, the Quartermaster Corps School in 1924 and the United States Army War College in 1925.

World War II
Promoted to brigadier general on December 24, 1941, Drake commanded the Quartermaster Corps in the Philippines during the Japanese invasion. He was third in command during the Battle of Corregidor in May 1942. Drake was held as a prisoner of war until 1945. He was awarded the Distinguished Service Medal and retired from the Army on October 31, 1946.

Later life
Drake and his wife Maud Louise (Gates) Drake (1891–1962) lived in Bethesda, Maryland in the early 1960s. They had two daughters and five grandchildren. He died in 1984 in Annandale, Virginia. Drake and his wife are buried at Arlington National Cemetery.

References

External links
Hall of Valor
Generals of World War II

1887 births
1984 deaths
People from Brockton, Massachusetts
United States Military Academy alumni
Military personnel from Massachusetts
United States Army personnel of World War I
United States Army Command and General Staff College alumni
United States Army War College alumni
United States Army generals of World War II
American prisoners of war in World War II
World War II prisoners of war held by Japan
Bataan Death March prisoners
Recipients of the Distinguished Service Medal (US Army)
United States Army generals
People from Bethesda, Maryland
Burials at Arlington National Cemetery
United States Army Infantry Branch personnel